Crown is a suburb of Johannesburg, South Africa. It is located in Region F of the City of Johannesburg Metropolitan Municipality. It is immediately south-west of the Johannesburg CBD.

References

Johannesburg Region B